This is a list of aviation museums and museums that contain significant aerospace-related exhibits throughout the world. The aviation museums are listed alphabetically by country and their article name.

Afghanistan
 OMAR Mine Museum, Kabul - includes a large collection of Soviet aircraft

Argentina
 , Bahía Blanca
 Museo Nacional de Aeronáutica de Argentina, Morón

Armenia
 Civil Aviation Museum, Zvartnots

Australia

Australian Capital Territory
 Australian War Memorial, Canberra

New South Wales
 Australian Aviation Museum, Bankstown
 Camden Museum of Aviation, Camden
 Luskintyre Aviation Flying Museum, Hunter Region
 Temora Aviation Museum, Temora
 Fighter World Museum, RAAF Williamtown
 Narromine Aviation Museum, Narromine
 Historical Aircraft Restoration Society, Illawarra Regional Airport, Albion Park Rail
 Fleet Air Arm Museum, Nowra
 Powerhouse Museum, Sydney
 RAAF Wagga Heritage Centre, Wagga Wagga

Northern Territory
 Central Australian Aviation Museum, Alice Springs
 Darwin Aviation Museum, Winnellie

Queensland
 Oakey Army Aviation Centre, Oakey
 Hinkler Hall of Aviation, Bundaberg
 Qantas Founders Outback Museum, Longreach
 Queensland Air Museum, Caloundra
 RAAF Heritage Centre, Amberley
 RAAF Townsville Museum, Townsville

South Australia
 South Australian Aviation Museum, Port Adelaide
 Greenock Aviation Museum, Greenock

Victoria
 Australian Gliding Museum, Bacchus Marsh
 Australian National Aviation Museum, Melbourne
 Ballarat Aviation Museum, Ballarat
 Drage Aviation Museum, Wangaratta
 Friends of the Anson Air Museum, Ballarat
 Latrobe Flying Museum, Traralgon
 RAAF Museum, RAAF Williams, Point Cook
 Sir Reginald Ansett Transport Museum, Hamilton

Western Australia
 Aviation Heritage Museum of Western Australia, Bull Creek
 Museum of Australian Commercial Aviation, Mount Barker

Austria
 , Bad Vöslau
 Fliegermuseum, Zeltweg
 , Wiener Neustadt
 Flying Bulls (Hangar-7), Salzburg
 Heeresgeschichtliches Museum, Vienna
 Museum Fahrzeug- Technik- Luftfahrt, Bad Ischl
 , Graz
 Technisches Museum Wien, Vienna

Belarus
 Belarusian Aviation Museum, Borovaya 
 "Stalin Line" museum, Zaslavl

Belgium
 First Wing Historical Centre, Beauvechain Air Base
 Flying Legends Collection, Kortrijk
 KB Air Museum, Kleine Brogel
 Royal Museum of the Armed Forces and of Military History, Brussels
 Musée Spitfire, Florennes
 Stampe and Vertongen Museum, Antwerp

Bolivia
 Bolivian Air Force Museum, El Alto

Brazil
 , São José dos Campos (SP)
 Museu Aeroespacial, Rio de Janeiro
 , Sao Pedro da Aldeia
 , Bebedouro, São Paulo
 TAM Museum, São Carlos
 Museu Militar Brasileiro, Panambi (RS)

Bulgaria

Burgas
 Burgas Aviation Museum

Sofia
 National Museum of Military History
 National Polytechnical Museum

Plovdiv
 Aviation and Air Force Museum, Krumovo

Burma
 Defence Services Museum, Nayptitaw, Burma

Cambodia
 War Museum Cambodia, Siem Reap

Canada

Alberta
 The Hangar Flight Museum, Calgary
 Bomber Command Museum of Canada, Nanton
 Alberta Aviation Museum, Edmonton
 Canada's Aviation Hall of Fame, Calgary
 Cold Lake Air Force Museum, Cold Lake
 Reynolds-Alberta Museum, Wetaskiwin

British Columbia
 British Columbia Aviation Museum, Sidney
 Canadian Museum of Flight, Langley
 Comox Air Force Museum, Comox

Manitoba
 Commonwealth Air Training Plan Museum, Brandon
 Manitoba Military Aviation Museum, CFB Winnipeg
 Royal Aviation Museum of Western Canada, Winnipeg
 Air Force Heritage Museum and Air Park, Winnipeg
 Canadian Starfighter Museum, St. Andrews Airport

Newfoundland and Labrador
 North Atlantic Aviation Museum, Gander

Nova Scotia
 Greenwood Military Aviation Museum, Greenwood
 Shearwater Aviation Museum, Shearwater
 Atlantic Canada Aviation Museum, Halifax Regional Municipality

Ontario
 Canada Aviation and Space Museum, Ottawa
 Canadian Air and Space Conservancy, Edenvale
 Canadian Bushplane Heritage Centre, Sault Ste. Marie
 Canadian Warplane Heritage Museum, Hamilton
 Great War Flying Museum, Brampton
 Jet Aircraft Museum, London
 Memorial Military Museum, Campbellford
 National Air Force Museum of Canada, CFB Trenton

Quebec
 Montreal Aviation Museum, Macdonald Campus, McGill University, Montréal
 Musée de la Défense aérienne, CFB Bagotville
 Quebec Aerospace Museum, St-Hubert
 Vintage Wings of Canada, Gatineau

Saskatchewan
 Saskatchewan Western Development Museum, Moose Jaw, Saskatchewan

Chile
 Museo Aeronáutico y del Espacio, Santiago
 Chilean Naval Aviation Museum, Viña del Mar

China
 Aviation Discovery Centre, Hong Kong, Hong Kong
 Aviation Museum of Guangzhou Aviation Technology Institute, Guangzhou
 Beijing Air and Space Museum, previously known as Beijing Aviation Museum, Beijing
 Chinese Aviation Museum, Datangshan, Changping District, Beijing
 Chinese Space Museum, Donggaodi, Fengtai District, Beijing
 Hong Kong Space Museum, Kowloon, Hong Kong
 Military Museum of the Chinese People's Revolution, Beijing
 Shenyang Aircraft Corporation Museum, Shenyang
 Yanliang Aviation Science and Technology Museum, Yanliang District, Xi'an

Colombia
 Colombian Aerospace Museum, Tocancipá
 , Bogotá
 Museo Nacional de Transporte, Cali

Croatia
 Nikola Tesla Technical Museum, Zagreb

Cuba

Havana
 Museo del Aire, Havana
 Museo de la Revolución, Havana

Matanzas
 Museo Giron, Matanzas

Czech Republic
 Air Park Zruč u Plzně, Zruč-Senec
 Muzeum letecké a pozemní techniky Vyškov, Vyškov
 Prague Aviation Museum, Kbely, Prague-Kbely
 National Technical Museum (Prague), Prague
 Letecké muzeum v Kunovicích, Kunovice
 , Brno
 , Mladá Boleslav

Denmark
 Danmarks Flymuseum, Stauning
 Flyvestation Karup's Historiske Forening Museet, Karup
 Aalborg Defence and Garrison Museum, Aalborg
 Springeren - Marine Experience Center, Aalborg
 Egeskov Castle, Egeskov
 Danmarks Tekniske Museum, Helsingør

Ecuador
 Museo Aeronáutico de la Fuerza Aérea Ecuatoriana, Quito

El Salvador
 Museo Nacional de Aviación, Ilopango

Estonia

 Estonian Aviation Museum, Tartu

Finland
 Aviation Museum of Central Finland
 Aviation Museum of South-Eastern Finland
 Finnish Aviation Museum
 Hallinportti Aviation Museum
 Karhulan ilmailukerho Aviation Museum
 Päijänne Tavastia Aviation Museum

France

 Ailes Anciennes Toulouse, Toulouse
 Aeroscopia, Blagnac
 , la Ferte-Alais
 CANOPEE, Châteaudun
 Centre d'Etudes et de Loisirs Aerospatiaux de Grenoble, le Versoud
 , Bordeaux-Merignac
 Le Memorial de Caen Museum, Caen
 L'Envol des pionniers, Toulouse
 L'Epopee de l'Industrie et de l'Aéronautique, Albert
 Musée Aéronautique du Berry, Touchay
 Musée Aéronautique de Cornouailles, Plobannalec-Lesconil
 Musée aéronautique et spatial Safran, Melun
 , Dax
 , Reims
 Musée de la Batterie de Merville, Merville-Franceville-Plage
 Musée de l'Air et de l'Espace, Le Bourget Airport, Paris
 Musée de l'Automobiliste, Mougins
 Musée de l'Aviation, Perpignan
 , Saint-Victoret
 Musée des Arts et Métiers, Paris
 , Pau
 , Rochefort
 , Sainte Mere Eglise
 Musée du Chateau Sávigny-lès-Beaune, Savigny-lès-Beaune
 , Montélimar - Ancône Airport
 , Biscarrosse
 , Angers - Loire Airport

Germany

Bavaria
 Aviation Pioneer Gustav Weisskopf Museum, Leutershausen
 , Gersthofen
 Deutsches Museum, Munich
 Deutsches Museum Flugwerft Schleissheim, Oberschleissheim
 Gerhard Neumann Museum, Niederalteich
 Hermann Oberth Space Travel Museum, Feucht, near Nuremberg
 Schwabisches Bauern und Technik Museum, Seifertshofen

Baden-Württemberg
 Albert Sammt Zeppelin Museum, Niederstetten
 Deutsch-Kanadische Luftwaffenmuseum, Baden Airpark
 Dornier Museum Friedrichshafen, Friedrichshafen
 Internationales Luftfahrt-Museum, Schwenningen
 Sinsheim Auto & Technik Museum, Sinsheim
 Zeppelin Museum Friedrichshafen, Friedrichshafen
 , Meersburg

Berlin
 Deutsche Luftfahrt Sammlung, Berlin
 German Museum of Technology, Berlin
 Luftwaffenmuseum der Bundeswehr, Berlin

Brandenburg
 Flugplatzmuseum Cottbus, Cottbus
 Hans Grade Museum, Borkheide
 , Finowfurt
 Otto Lilienthal Verein Stölln e.V, Stölln

Hesse
 Deutsches Segelflugmuseum mit Modellflug, Gersfeld
 Grenzmuseum, Bad Sooden-Allendorf
 Zeppelin Museum Zeppelinheim, Frankfurt am Main

Lower Saxony
 Aeronauticum, Nordholz
 Aviation Museum Hannover-Laatzen, Laatzen
 Hubschrauber Museum, Buckeburg
 , Wunstorf

Mecklenburg-Western Pomerania
 Historisch-Technisches Informationszentrum, Peenemuende
 Interessenverein Luftfahrt Neuenkirchen, Neuenkirchen
 Luftfahrttechnischen Museum Rechlin, Rechlin
 Otto-Lilienthal-Museum, Anklam

North Rhine-Westphalia
 Motor Technica Museum, Bad Oeynhausen

Rhineland-Palatinate
 Flugausstellung L.+ P. Junior, Hermeskeil
 Technikmuseum Speyer, Speyer
 , Koblenz

Saxony
 Aero Park Leipzig, Leipzig/Halle Airport
 AMF-Museum, Fichtelberg
 Fliegendes Museum Historische Flugzeuge Josef Koch, Grossenhain
 Luftfahrttechnischer Museumsverein Rothenburg, Rothenburg
 Militaerhistorisches Museum der Bundeswehr, Dresden

Saxony-Anhalt
 , Merseburg
 Museum für Luftfahrt und Technik, Wernigerode
 , Dessau

Thuringia
 Flugwelt Museum, Leipzig-Altenburg Airport

Greece
 Elefsis Heritage Park, Elefsina
 Hellenic Air Force Museum, Dekeleia
 Hellenic Civil Aviation Museum, Athens
 Larisa Base Museum, Larisa
 Ministry of National Defence War Museum, Thessaloniki
 Tanagra Base Collection, Tanagra
 War Museum, Athens

Guatemala 
Guatemalan Aeronautical Museum, Guatemala City

Honduras 
Honduran Aviation Museum, Tegucigalpa

Hungary
 Aeropark, Budapest Ferenc Liszt International Airport, Budapest
 Budapest Transport Museum, City Park, Budapest
 Museum of Hungarian Aviation, Szolnok
 Museum 'Secrets of the Soviet airbase', Berekfurdo

Iceland
 Icelandic Aviation Museum, Akureyri

India
 HAL Aerospace Museum, Bangalore
 Indian Air Force Museum, Palam
 Naval Aviation Museum, Dabolim
 Pragati Aerospace Museum, Ozar
 TU 142 Aircraft Museum, Visakhapatnam

Indonesia
 Dirgantara Mandala Museum, Yogyakarta

Iran
 Iranian Air Force Museum, Doshan Tappeh Air Base
 Military Museum, Tehran
 Tehran Aerospace Exhibition Center, Tehran

Ireland
 Air Corps Museum, Baldonnel
 Foynes Flying Boat Museum, Foynes

Israel
 Air and Space Museum Rishon LeZion, Rishon LeZion
 Haifa Airport Museum, Haifa
 Israeli Air Force Museum, Hatzerim

Italy

 Ditellandia Air Acqua Park Zoo Safari, Mondragone
 Gianni Caproni Museum of Aeronautics
 Museo Aeroportuale Cameri Air Base Museum, Cameri
 Museo Agusta, Cascina Costa
 Museo dell'Aeronautica Gianni Caproni, Trento
 , Castello di San Pelagio
 Museo Nazionale della Scienza e della Tecnologia "Leonardo da Vinci", Milan
 , Palermo
 Italian Air Force Museum, Vigna di Valle
 , Rimini
 Volandia, Milan-Malpensa Airport

Japan

Honshu
 Aichi Museum of Flight Nagoya, Aichi
 Misawa Aviation & Science Museum, Misawa, Aomori
 Tokorozawa Aviation Museum, Tokorozawa, Saitama
 Museum of Aeronautical Science, Shibayama, Chiba
  (Hamamatsu Air Base), Hamamatsu, Shizuoka
 , Kakamigahara, Gifu
 Ishikawa Aviation Plaza, Komatsu, Ishikawa
 Modern Transportation Museum, Osaka (closed 2014)
 Kawaguchiko Motor Museum, Narusawa, Yamanashi

Hokkaido
 Bihoro Aviation Park, Bihoro, Hokkaido

Laos
 Lao People's Army History Museum, Vientiane

Latvia
 Riga Aviation Museum

Lebanon
 Lebanon Air Force Museum, Rayak

Lithuania
 Lithuanian Aviation Museum, Kaunas

Malaysia
 Malaysia Air Force Museum, Kuala Lumpur
 Muzium Pengangkutan Melaka, Malacca
 Port Dickson Army Museum, Port Dickson

Malta
 Malta Aviation Museum, Ta' Qali

Mexico
 Museo del Concorde, Ciudad Juárez, Chihuahua
 Mexican Air Force Museum

Nepal
Aircraft Museum Dhangadhi, Dhangadhi
Aircraft Museum Kathmandu, Kathmandu

Netherlands
 Aviodrome, Lelystad Airport, Lelystad
 , Aalsmeerderbrug
 Gyrocopter Aviation Historisch Museum, Midden-Zeeland Airport, Middelburg
 , De Cocksdorp
 Militaire Luchtvaart Museum, Soesterberg - defunct
 Nationaal Militair Museum, Soesterberg
 Overloon War Museum, Overloon
 , Noordwijk
 Stichting Koninklijke Luchtmacht Historische Vlucht, Gilze-Rijen Air Base, Breda
 Vliegend Museum Seppe, Seppe Airport, Hoeven
 VroegeVogels, Lelystad Airport
 , Best

New Zealand

 Air Force Museum of New Zealand, Christchurch
 Ashburton Aviation Museum, Ashburton
 Classic Flyers Museum, Tauranga Airport, Mount Maunganui
 New Zealand Fighter Pilots Museum, Wanaka Airport
 Museum of Transport and Technology, Auckland
 Omaka Aviation Heritage Centre, Blenheim, New Zealand
 Warbirds and Wheels, Wanaka

Nigeria 

 Nigerian War Museum

Norway

 Flyhistorisk Museum, Sola, Stavanger
 Norsk Teknisk Museum, Oslo
 Norwegian Armed Forces Aircraft Collection, Gardermoen (by Oslo)
 Norwegian Aviation Museum, Bodø
 Spitsbergen Airship Museum

Pakistan
 Pakistan Air Force Museum, Karachi

Peru
 Museo Aeronáutico del Perú, Lima

Philippines
 Air Force City Park, Clark Air Base
 Philippine Air Force Aerospace Museum, Manila

Poland
Aerospace museums
 Polish Aviation Museum, Kraków
 , Dęblin
Other museums with aerospace exhibits:
 Polish Army Museum, Warsaw (large collection)
 Museum of Polish Military Technology, Warsaw   (large collection)
 Lubuskie Muzeum Wojskowe, Drzonów (small collection)
 Polish Navy Museum, Gdynia (small collection)
 Muzeum Orła Białego, Skarżysko-Kamienna (small collection)

Portugal
 Museu do Ar, Alverca and Sintra
 Museu Aero Fénix, Santarém and Alverca
 Navy Museum, Lisbon

Romania
 Colegiul Tehnic de Aeronautică Henri Coandă, Bucharest
 , Bucharest
 National Military Museum, Bucharest

Russia
 Central Air Force Museum, Monino
 Central Armed Forces Museum, Moscow
 Central House of Aviation and Cosmonautics DOSAAF of Russia, Moscow
 , Kurgan
 Long Range Aviation Museum, Ryazan
 Memorial Museum of Cosmonautics, Moscow
 , Lyubertsy, Moscow Oblast
 , Safonovo, Murmansk Oblast
 , Gatchina, Leningrad Oblast
 , Volgograd
 , Ivanovo
 RKK Energiya museum, Korolyov, Moscow Oblast
 Taganrog Aviation Museum, Taganrog
 Torzok Aviation Museum, Torzok
 Tsiolkovsky State Museum of the History of Cosmonautics, Kaluga
 Ulyanovsk Aircraft Museum, Ulyanovsk
 , Krasnogorsky District, Moscow Oblast

Saudi Arabia
 Royal Saudi Air Force Museum, Riyadh

Serbia
 Museum of Aviation, Belgrade

Singapore
 RSAF Museum, Paya Lebar

Slovakia
 Museum of Aviation, Košice
 Vojenske Historicke Muzeum, Piešťany

Slovenia 

 Park of Military History, Pivka

South Africa
 Pioneers of Aviation Museum, Kimberley, Northern Cape
 South African Air Force Museum, Pretoria, Port Elizabeth and Cape Town
 South African Airways Museum, Gauteng

South Korea
 , Jeju Island
 KAI Aerospace Museum, Sacheon
 War Memorial of Korea, Seoul

Spain
 , Madrid
 , Málaga
 Museo del Aire (Aeronautics and Astronautics Museum of Spain), Cuatro Vientos
 , Sabadell, Barcelona
 , Las Palmas

Sri Lanka
Sri Lanka Air Force Museum, Ratmalana

Sweden
 Arlanda Flygsamlingar, Stockholm Arlanda Airport
 Aeroseum, Gothenburg City Airport, Gothenburg
 , Ängelholm
 , Söderhamn
 , Luleå
 Flygvapenmuseum, Linköping
 Optand Teknikland, Östersund
 , Ugglarp
 Västerås Flygmuseum, Västerås

Switzerland
 Clin d'Ailes, Payerne
 Fliegermuseum, Altenrhein
 Flieger-Flab-Museum, Dübendorf
 Swiss Transport Museum, Lucerne

Taiwan

 Chung Cheng Aviation Museum, Taoyuan
 Republic of China Air Force Museum, Kaohsiung

Thailand
 Royal Thai Air Force Museum, Bangkok

Turkey
 Ankara Aviation Museum, Ankara
 Eskişehir Aviation Museum, Eskişehir
 Istanbul Aeronautics Museum, Istanbul
 Kutahya Aviation Museum, Kutahya
 M.S.Ö. Air & Space Museum, Sivrihisar
 Rahmi M. Koç Museum, Istanbul

Ukraine
 Aviation Technical Museum, Luhansk
 Museum of the Antonov Company History, Kyiv
 Museum of Space Exploration, Pereiaslav
 Poltava Museum of Long-Range and Strategic Aviation, Poltava
 Sergei Pavlovich Korolyov Museum of Cosmonautics, Zhytomyr
 Ukrainian Air Force Museum, Vinnytsia
 Ukraine State Aviation Museum, Kyiv

United Kingdom

England

 Aeropark, East Midlands Airport, Castle Donington, Leicestershire
 Aerospace Bristol
 Army Flying Museum, Middle Wallop, Hampshire
 Avro Heritage Museum
 Battle of Britain Memorial Flight, RAF Coningsby, Lincolnshire
 Bentwaters Cold War Museum, Woodbridge, Suffolk
 Bournemouth Aviation Museum, Hurn, Dorset
 Brooklands Museum, Weybridge, Surrey
 City of Norwich Aviation Museum. Norwich International Airport, Norfolk
 Cornwall Aviation Heritage Centre, RAF St Mawgan, Newquay, Cornwall
 Croydon Airport Visitor Centre, Croydon, Greater London
 de Havilland Aircraft Museum, London Colney, Hertfordshire
 Farnborough Air Sciences Trust, Farnborough, Hampshire
 Fleet Air Arm Museum, Yeovilton, Somerset
 Gatwick Aviation Museum, Charlwood, Surrey
 Gliding Heritage Centre, Lasham Airfield, Hampshire
 Imperial War Museum Duxford, Cambridge, Cambridgeshire
 Jet Age Museum, Gloucester
 Kent Battle of Britain Museum, Folkestone, Kent
 Lashenden Air Warfare Museum, Headcorn, Kent
 Lincolnshire Aviation Heritage Centre, East Kirkby, Lincolnshire
 Midland Air Museum, Coventry, Warwickshire
 Museum of Berkshire Aviation, Woodley, Berkshire
 Newark Air Museum, Nottinghamshire
 Norfolk and Suffolk Aviation Museum, Flixton, Suffolk
 North East Land, Sea and Air Museums, Sunderland, Tyne and Wear
 RAF Manston History Museum, RAF Manston, Kent
 Rolls-Royce Heritage Trust, Derby, Derbyshire
 Royal Air Force Museum London, Hendon, London
 Royal Air Force Museum Cosford, Cosford, Shropshire
 Science and Industry Museum, Manchester
 Science Museum, London SW7
 Shoreham Airport Visitor Centre, Shoreham Airport, West Sussex
 Shoreham Aircraft Museum, Shoreham, Kent
 Shuttleworth Collection, Old Warden, Bedfordshire
 Solent Sky, Southampton, Hampshire
 Solway Aviation Museum, Carlisle Lake District Airport, Cumbria
 South Yorkshire Aircraft Museum, Doncaster, South Yorkshire
 Sywell Aviation Museum, Northamptonshire
 Tangmere Military Aviation Museum, Tangmere, West Sussex
 The Helicopter Museum, Weston-super-Mare, Somerset
 Thinktank, Birmingham Science Museum, Birmingham, West Midlands
 Wings Museum, Balcombe, West Sussex
 Yorkshire Air Museum, Elvington, North Yorkshire

Isle of Man
 Manx Aviation and Military Museum, Castletown

Northern Ireland
 Ulster Folk and Transport Museum, Belfast

Scotland
 Dumfries and Galloway Aviation Museum, Dumfries
 Montrose Air Station Heritage Centre, Angus
 Morayvia, Kinloss
 National Museum of Flight, East Fortune, East Lothian

Wales
 Caernarfon Airworld Aviation Museum, Caernarfon, Gwynedd

United States

Alabama
 Battleship Memorial Park, Mobile
 Southern Museum of Flight, Birmingham
 United States Space & Rocket Center, Huntsville
United States Army Aviation Museum, Fort Rucker

Alaska
 Pioneer Air Museum / Interior and Arctic Alaska Aeronautical Foundation, Fairbanks
 Alaska Aviation Heritage Museum, Anchorage
 Alaska Museum of Transportation and Industry, Wasilla

Arkansas
 Arkansas Air & Military Museum, Fayetteville
 Wings of Honor Museum, Walnut Ridge

Arizona
 Arizona Commemorative Air Force Museum, Falcon Field, Mesa
 Champlin Fighter Museum, Falcon Field, Mesa – closed
 Pima Air & Space Museum, near Tucson
 Titan Missile Museum, Sahuarita
 Planes of Fame Museum, Valle

California
 Aerospace Museum of California, Sacramento
 Air Force Flight Test Center Museum, Edwards Air Force Base 
 Blackbird Airpark, Palmdale
 California Science Center, Los Angeles
 Castle Air Museum, Atwater, adjacent to the former Castle Air Force Base
 Chico Air Museum, Chico
 Classic Rotors Museum, Ramona
 Commemorative Air Force Southern California Wing, Camarillo Airport, Camarillo
 Dryden Flight Research Center Visitor Facility, Edwards Air Force Base near Palmdale
 Estrella Warbird Museum, Paso Robles
 Flight Path Learning Center & Museum, Los Angeles International Airport, Los Angeles, California
 Flying Leatherneck Aviation Museum, Marine Corps Air Station Miramar, San Diego, California
 Gillespie Field, El Cajon, California, San Diego Air and Space Museum Gillespie Field Annex
 Hiller Aviation Museum, San Carlos, California
 Joe Davies Heritage Airpark, at Palmdale Plant 42, Palmdale, California
 Lyon Air Museum, Santa Ana, California
 March Field Air Museum, Riverside, California
 Milestones of Flight Museum, Lancaster, California
 Moffett Field Historical Society Museum, Moffet Field, Mountain View, California
 Museum of Flying, Santa Monica, California
 NASA Ames Exploration Center, Mountain View, California
 Oakland Aviation Museum, Oakland, California
 Pacific Coast Air Museum, Santa Rosa, California
 Palm Springs Air Museum, Palm Springs, California
 Planes of Fame, Chino, California
 Point Mugu Missile Park, Navy Base Ventura County, at Point Mugu
 Proud Bird Restaurant and Museum, Los Angeles, California
 Ronald Reagan Presidential Library, Simi Valley, California
 San Diego Air & Space Museum, located at Balboa Park (San Diego) in San Diego, California
 Santa Maria Museum of Flight, Santa Maria, California
 Saxon Aerospace Museum, Boron, California
 Stockton Field Aviation Museum, Stockton, California
 Travis Air Force Base Heritage Center, Travis Air Force Base, Fairfield, California
 USS Hornet Museum, Alameda, California
 USS Midway Museum, also called the San Diego Aircraft Carrier Museum, Navy Pier, San Diego, California
 U.S. Naval Museum of Armament and Technology, China Lake, California
 Western Museum of Flight, Torrance, California
 Wings of History Museum, San Martin, California
 Yanks Air Museum, Chino, California
 Yanks Air Museum Annex, Greenfield, California

Colorado
 National Museum of World War II Aviation, Colorado Springs
 Peterson Air and Space Museum, Colorado Springs
 Pueblo Weisbrod Aircraft Museum, Pueblo
 Spirit of Flight Center, Erie
 Vintage Aero Flying Museum, Hudson
 Wings Over the Rockies Air and Space Museum, Denver, Colorado

Connecticut
 Connecticut Air and Space Center, Stratford
 National Helicopter Museum, Stratford
 New England Air Museum, Windsor Locks
 Pratt & Whitney Hangar Museum, East Hartford, Connecticut

Delaware
 Air Mobility Command Museum, Dover

Florida
 Air Force Armament Museum, near Valparaiso
 Air Force Space and Missile Museum, Cape Canaveral Space Force Station
 Airport Museum, Melbourne
 American Space Museum, Titusville
 DeLand Naval Air Station Museum, Deland
 EAA Chapter 1241 Air Museum, Florida Keys Marathon Airport, Marathon, Florida
 Fantasy of Flight, Polk City
 Florida Air Museum, Lakeland
 Kennedy Space Center Visitor Complex, Merritt Island
 Kissimmee Air Museum
 National Naval Aviation Museum, Pensacola
 Sands Space and Missile History Center, outside the south gate of Cape Canaveral Air Force Station 
 United States Astronaut Hall of Fame (now at Kennedy Space Center Visitor Complex)
 Valiant Air Command Warbird Museum, Titusville
 Wings of Dreams Aviation Museum, Keystone Heights
 Wings Over Miami, Tamiami Airport, Miami

Georgia
 Aviation History & Technology Center, Marietta, Georgia
 Delta Flight Museum, Atlanta, Georgia
 Mighty Eighth Air Force Museum, Pooler, Georgia
 Museum of Aviation, Warner Robins, Georgia
 National Museum of Commercial Aviation, Forest Park, Georgia

Hawaii
 Naval Air Museum Barbers Point, Kalaeloa Airport, Kapolei
 Pacific Aviation Museum Pearl Harbor, Honolulu

Idaho
 Bird Aviation Museum and Invention Center, Sagle, Idaho
 Idaho Military History Museum, Boise Airport
 Legacy Flight Museum, Rexburg, Idaho
 Warhawk Air Museum, Nampa, Idaho

Illinois

 Air Classics Aviation Museum, Sugar Grove, Illinois
 Air Combat Museum, Springfield, Illinois
 Butch O'Hare Exhibit at O'Hare International Airport, Chicago, Illinois
 Greater Saint Louis Air & Space Museum, Cahokia Heights, Illinois
 Heritage In Flight Museum, Lincoln, Illinois
 Illinois Aviation Museum at Bolingbrook, Bolingbrook, Illinois
 Museum of Science and Industry, Chicago, Illinois
 Octave Chanute Aerospace Museum, Rantoul, Illinois
 Prairie Aviation Museum, Bloomington, Illinois
 Russell Military Museum, Zion, Illinois
 Vintage Wings & Wheels Museum, Poplar Grove, Illinois
 The Warbird Heritage Foundation, Waukegan, Illinois
 The World Aerospace Museum, Quincy, Illinois

Indiana
 Atterbury-Bakalar Air Museum, Columbus, Indiana
 Greater Fort Wayne Aviation Museum, Fort Wayne, Indiana
 Grissom Air Museum, Peru, Indiana
 Hoosier Air Museum, Auburn, Indiana
 The Larry D. Bell Aircraft Museum, Mentone, Indiana
 Indiana Military Museum, Vincennes, Indiana
 National Model Aviation Museum, Muncie, Indiana
 National American Huey History Museum, Peru, Indiana
 Rolls-Royce Heritage Trust, Allison Branch, Indianapolis, Indiana

Iowa
 Airpower Museum (Antique Airfield)
 Iowa Aviation Museum, Greenfield, Iowa
 Iowa Aviation Heritage Museum, Ankeny, Iowa
 Mid American Museum Of Aviation & Transportation, Sioux City, Iowa

Kansas
 Combat Air Museum, Topeka, Kansas
 Kansas Aviation Museum, Wichita, Kansas
 Cosmosphere, Hutchinson, Kansas
 Mid-America Air Museum, Liberal, Kansas

Kentucky
 Aviation Museum of Kentucky, Lexington, Kentucky
 Don F. Pratt Museum, Fort Campbell, Kentucky
 Kentucky Aviation Museum, Louisville, Kentucky

Louisiana
 Barksdale Global Power Museum, Bossier City, Louisiana
 National World War II Museum, New Orleans

Maine
 Maine Air Museum, Bangor, Maine
 Owls Head Transportation Museum, Owls Head, Maine

Maryland
 College Park Aviation Museum, College Park, Maryland
 Glenn L. Martin Maryland Aviation Museum, Middle River, Maryland
 Hagerstown Aviation Museum, Hagerstown, Maryland
 Patuxent River Naval Air Museum, Lexington Park, Maryland
 Massey Air Museum, Massey, Maryland

Massachusetts
 The Collings Foundation, Stow, Massachusetts
 Massachusetts Air and Space Museum, Hyannis, Massachusetts

Michigan
 Air Zoo, Portage, Michigan (bordering Kalamazoo)
 K. I. Sawyer Air Force Base Heritage Museum, K. I. Sawyer, Michigan, located south of Marquette, Michigan. 
 Selfridge Military Air Museum, Mount Clemens, Michigan
 The Henry Ford, Dearborn, Michigan
 Yankee Air Museum, Belleville, Michigan

Minnesota
 American Wings Air Museum, Blaine, Minnesota
 Fagen Fighters WWII Museum, Granite Falls, Minnesota
 Golden Wings Flying Museum, Blaine, Minnesota
 Commemorative Air Force Museum, Inver Grove Heights, Minnesota
 Minnesota Air National Guard Museum, Minneapolis-St. Paul International Airport, Minneapolis, Minnesota
 Northwest Airlines History Center Museum, Bloomington, Minnesota
 Wings of the North Air Museum, Flying Cloud Airport, Eden Prairie, Minnesota

Mississippi
 Mississippi Armed Forces Museum, Camp Shelby, Mississippi

Missouri
 Historic Aircraft Restoration Museum, St. Louis, Missouri
 James S. McDonnell Prologue Room, St. Louis, Missouri
 National Museum of Transportation, St. Louis, Missouri
 National Airline History Museum, Kansas City, Missouri

Montana
 Malmstrom Museum, Great Falls
 Stonehenge Air Museum, Fortine

Nebraska
 Strategic Air and Space Museum, Ashland, Nebraska

Nevada
 American Museum of Aviation, Las Vegas, Nevada
 Thunderbirds Museum, Las Vegas, Nevada

New Hampshire
 Aviation Museum of New Hampshire, Londonderry, New Hampshire
 McAuliffe-Shepard Discovery Center, Concord, New Hampshire

New Jersey
 Air Victory Museum, Lumberton, New Jersey
 Aviation Hall of Fame and Museum of New Jersey, Teterboro, New Jersey
 Naval Air Station Wildwood Aviation Museum, Cape May, New Jersey

New Mexico
 New Mexico Museum of Space History, Alamogordo, New Mexico
 National Museum of Nuclear Science & History, Albuquerque, New Mexico
 US Southwest Soaring Museum, Moriarty, New Mexico
 War Eagles Air Museum, Santa Teresa, New Mexico
 Western New Mexico Aviation Heritage Museum, Grants, New Mexico

New York
 American Airpower Museum, East Farmingdale, New York
 Cradle of Aviation Museum, Garden City, New York
 Empire State Aerosciences Museum, Glenville, New York
 Floyd Bennett Field Administration Building Visitor Center, Brooklyn, New York
 Glenn H. Curtiss Museum, Hammondsport, New York
 Historic Aircraft Restoration Project, Floyd Bennett Field, Brooklyn, New York
 Intrepid Sea-Air-Space Museum, New York, New York
 National Soaring Museum, Elmira, New York
 National Warplane Museum, Geneseo, New York
 Niagara Aerospace Museum, Niagara Falls, New York
 Old Rhinebeck Aerodrome, Rhinebeck, New York
 Wings of Eagles Discovery Center, Elmira, New York

North Carolina
 82nd Airborne Division War Memorial Museum, Fort Bragg, North Carolina
 Carolinas Aviation Museum, Charlotte, North Carolina
 Hickory Aviation Museum, Hickory, North Carolina
 Museum of Life and Science, Durham, North Carolina
 North Carolina Aviation Museum and Hall of Fame, Asheboro, North Carolina
 North Carolina Transportation Museum, Spencer, North Carolina
 Wright Brothers National Memorial, Kitty Hawk, North Carolina
 US Army Airborne & Special Operations Museum, Fayetteville, North Carolina

North Dakota
 Fargo Air Museum, Fargo, North Dakota
 Dakota Territory Air Museum, Minot, North Dakota
 North Dakota Aviation Hall of Fame, Bismarck, North Dakota

Ohio
 Armstrong Air and Space Museum, Wapakoneta, Ohio
 Butler County Warbirds, Middletown, Ohio
 Carillon Historical Park, Dayton, Ohio
 Champaign Aviation Museum, Urbana, Ohio
 Crawford Auto-Aviation Museum, Cleveland, Ohio
 Dayton Aviation Heritage National Historical Park, Dayton, Ohio
 Historical Aircraft Squadron, Lancaster, Ohio
 International Women's Air & Space Museum, Cleveland, Ohio
 Liberty Aviation Museum, Port Clinton, Ohio
 MAPS Air Museum, Canton, Ohio
 Motts Military Museum, Groveport, Ohio
 NASA Glenn Research Center, Cleveland, Ohio
 National Museum of the United States Air Force, in Dayton, Ohio
 National Aviation Hall of Fame, Dayton, Ohio
 Tri-State Warbird Museum, Batavia, Ohio
 WACO Air Museum, Troy, Ohio

Oklahoma
 Oklahoma Museum of Flying, Bethany, Oklahoma
 Science Museum Oklahoma, Oklahoma City, Oklahoma
 Stafford Air & Space Museum, Weatherford, Oklahoma
 Tulsa Air and Space Museum & Planetarium, Tulsa, Oklahoma

Oregon
 Classic Aircraft Aviation Museum, Hillsboro
 Erickson Aircraft Collection, Madras
 Evergreen Aviation & Space Museum, McMinnville
 Oregon Air and Space Museum, Eugene
 Tillamook Air Museum, Tillamook
 Western Antique Aeroplane & Automobile Museum, Hood River

Pennsylvania
 Air Heritage Museum, Beaver Falls, Pennsylvania
 American Helicopter Museum & Education Center, West Chester, Pennsylvania
 Eagles Mere Air Museum, Eagles Mere, Pennsylvania
 Golden Age Air Museum, Bethel, Berks County, Pennsylvania
 Mid-Atlantic Air Museum, Reading, Pennsylvania
 Piper Aviation Museum, Lockhaven, Pennsylvania
 Wings of Freedom Aviation Museum, Naval Air Station Joint Reserve Base Willow Grove, Philadelphia, Pennsylvania

Rhode Island
 Quonset Air Museum, Quonset Point, North Kingstown, Rhode Island - closed in 2016

South Carolina
 Patriots Point, Charleston, South Carolina

South Dakota
 Minuteman Missile National Historic Site, Wall, South Dakota
 South Dakota Air and Space Museum, Box Elder, South Dakota

Tennessee
 Beechcraft Heritage Museum, Tullahoma, Tennessee
 Tennessee Museum of Aviation, Sevierville, Tennessee

Texas
 1940 Air Terminal Museum, Houston, Texas
 B-36 Peacemaker Museum, Fort Worth, Texas
 Cavanaugh Flight Museum, Addison, Texas
 Cold War Air Museum, Lancaster, Texas
 American Airlines C.R. Smith Museum, Fort Worth, Texas
 Flight of the Phoenix Aviation Museum, Gilmer, Texas
 Fort Worth Aviation Museum, Fort Worth, Texas
 Frontiers of Flight Museum, Dallas, Texas
 Lone Star Flight Museum, Houston, Texas
 Midland Army Air Field Museum, Midland, Texas
 Military Firefighter Heritage Display, Goodfellow Air Force Base, San Angelo, Texas
 Museum of Aerospace Medicine, San Antonio, Texas
 National Aviation Education Center, Dallas, Texas
 Silent Wings Museum, Lubbock, Texas
 Space Center Houston, Johnson Space Center, Houston, Texas
 Texas Air Museum at Slaton Municipal Airport, Slaton, Texas
 Texas Air Museum at Stinson Field, San Antonio, Texas
 Texas Air & Space Museum, Rick Husband Amarillo International Airport, Amarillo, Texas
 Texas Military Forces Museum, Camp Mabry, Austin, Texas
 USS Lexington Museum on the Bay, Corpus Christi, Texas
 Vintage Flying Museum, Meacham International Airport, Fort Worth, Texas

Utah
 Hill Aerospace Museum, Ogden, Utah
 Commemorative Air Force Utah Wing, Russ McDonald Field, Heber

Vermont
 Experimental Balloon and Airship Museum, Thetford, Vermont

Virginia
 Air Power Park, Hampton, Virginia
 Aviation Heritage Park, Virginia Beach, Virginia
 Military Aviation Museum, Virginia Beach, Virginia
 National Air and Space Museum Steven F. Udvar-Hazy Center, Chantilly, Virginia
 Virginia Aviation Museum, Richmond, Virginia - closed in 2016
 Virginia Museum of Transportation, Roanoke, Virginia
 Virginia Air and Space Center, Hampton, Virginia
 NASA Visitor Center (Wallops Flight Facility), Wallops Island, Virginia
 Science Museum of Virginia, Richmond, Virginia - includes some exhibits from the closed Virginia Aviation Museum
 Shannon Air Museum, Fredericksburg, Virginia

Washington
 Flying Heritage & Combat Armor Museum, Everett, Washington
 Future of Flight Aviation Center & Boeing Tour, Mukilteo, Washington
 Heritage Flight Museum, Burlington, Washington
 Historic Flight Foundation, Spokane, Washington
 Museum of Flight, Seattle, Washington
 North Cascades Vintage Aircraft Museum, Concrete, Washington
 Olympic Flight Museum, Olympia, Washington
 Pearson Air Museum, Vancouver, Washington
 Port Townsend Aero Museum, Jefferson County International Airport, Port Townsend, Washington
 Wings of History Museum, Bellevue, Washington

Washington, D.C.
 National Air and Space Museum, Washington, D.C.

Wisconsin
 EAA Aviation Museum, Oshkosh, Wisconsin
 Mitchell Gallery of Flight, Milwaukee, Wisconsin

Wyoming
 Callair Museum, Afton, Wyoming

Uruguay
 Colonel Jaime Meregalli Aeronautical Museum

Venezuela
 Museo Aeronáutico de Maracay

Vietnam
 Museum of Air Force and Air Defense Force, Hanoi
 Vietnam Military History Museum, Hanoi
Vietnam People's Air Force Museum, Ho Chi Minh City
Vietnam People's Air Force Museum, Hanoi
War Remnants Museum, Ho Chi Minh City

See also
 List of airport museums in the United States
 List of transport museums
 List of United States Air Force museums
 Airports for antique aircraft

References

External links

 AviationMuseum.eu
 AirplaneExhibits.com
 Aviation Museums - Museums.aero
 Directory - Air Museum Network
 Aviation Museum locator - Aero-web.org
 Museums and Public Access Displays of North America - Aerofiles
 Air & Space Museum Links - Classic Airliners
 Aviation Museum Guide - Skytamer
 Museums, Alphabetical by State - Aero.com (Archived)
 Warbird Museum Links - Warbird Alley
 Aviation Museums - J-HangarSpace
 Aviation Museums within the USA - Travel for Aircraft
 California Aerospace and Aviation Museums - NASA
 Aviation Museums - Visit NC
 KML (Google Earth geolocations) file of Aviation Museums

Museum
Lists of transport museums